Coombe, Devon may refer to various places in Devon, England:

 Coombe, East Devon
 Coombe, Tiverton, Devon 
 Coombe, Teignmouth, Devon 

See also:

 Combe, Devon (disambiguation)